West Linn is a city in Clackamas County, Oregon, United States. A southern suburb within the Portland metropolitan area, West Linn developed on the site of the former Linn City, which was named after U.S. Senator Lewis F. Linn of Ste. Genevieve, Missouri, who had advocated the American occupation of the Oregon territory as a counterclaim to the British.

The Sullivan hydroelectric plant opened in 1889, and harvested energy from nearby Willamette Falls.  The adjacent Willamette Falls Paper Company began operations the same year.

As of the 2020 census, the city had a population of 27,373.

History

Prior to settlement by Oregon pioneers, the area which became known as West Linn was the home of ancestors of some of the present-day Confederated Tribes of the Grand Ronde Community of Oregon.

19th century
Major Robert Moore was an early settler who arrived in 1839—before the Champoeg Meetings—having been the senior member of the first attempt to create an American state in Oregon, the Peoria Party. After journeying around the Willamette Valley and Columbia Basin, Moore bought title to approx.  on the west side of Willamette Falls, across the Willamette River from Oregon City, from Native American Chief Wanaxha of the Wallamut Tribe, on which he platted a town he called "Robin's Nest" in early 1843. He also filed a provisional claim with the then government of the Oregon Country, not knowing if his transaction would be honored by the eventual governing laws. The Oregon Territorial Legislature voted to rename it Linn City on December 22, 1845, as a memorial to Senator Lewis F. Linn after whom Linn County is also named. Linn was a neighbor and family friend of the Moores from their time as settlers in the early Missouri Territory.

For many years Linn City was a political and commercial rival to the adjacent town of Oregon City, but it suffered a series of natural and man-made setbacks. A major fire and the Great Flood of 1862 put a halt to the pioneer settlement in 1861, dispersing many of the surviving family members throughout the Pacific Northwest.

The Willamette Falls Locks and canal were completed in 1873, making the waterfall passable by river traffic.  The locks closed in 2011 with no plans to reopen.

The Willamette Falls Paper Company began operation in 1889.

20th century

West Linn was incorporated in 1913 and merged with the adjacent town of Willamette in 1916, which had incorporated five years earlier. When the City of West Linn incorporated in 1913, it encompassed West Oregon City, Bolton, Sunset and Willamette Heights. The incorporation allowed the settlements to obtain needed services, utilities, and improvements without annexing to Oregon City. After considerable debate about naming, the city founders decided to honor the pioneer town that Moore had established. 

The Oregon City Bridge was built in 1922.

The city's population historically grew steadily, but in recent years has leveled off. The 1860 census listed 225 residents. By 1920, the number had grown to 1,628. The 1960 census set the population at 2,923, and by 1970, West Linn had grown to more than 7,000. The city's population has continued to grow each year. Currently, the city's population is 25,250.

21st century
In 2011, the City of West Linn was the Top-Ranked Oregon city on the CNN/Money Magazine 'Best Places to Live 2011' List.  Citing 'breathtaking views of the Cascades and relatively low local taxes,' the Number 69 listing includes a photo of Central Village, and also mentions the Music in the Park concert series, the historic Willamette area, the farmer's market, and the Street Dance.  The City of Sherwood is the only other Oregon city to make the 2011 listing, coming in at Number 100.  In 2009, the City of West Linn was included on the 'Best Places to Live 2009' list.  Oregonians move to the hilltop homes here for a scenic view of the Cascades and relatively low local taxes. With Portland just 25 minutes away, most residents commute into the city during the week. Weekends are spent enjoying waterfront recreation: West Linn sits at the junction of two rivers. On summer evenings, residents enjoy picnic dinners over concerts in the park. Locals also flock to a revitalized downtown area, Historic Willamette, which offers a farmer's market and, occasionally, dancing in the street.

In 2012, the City of West Linn was named a Tree City USA Community by the Arbor Day Foundation for its commitment to urban forestry. It is the 19th year West Linn has earned this national honor from the Arbor Day Foundation, the nation's largest nonprofit organization dedicated to planting trees. "We all benefit when communities like West Linn place a high priority on planting and caring for trees, one of our nation's most beautiful resources," said John Rosenow, chief executive and founder of the Arbor Day Foundation. "Trees shade our homes and add beauty to our neighborhoods, and they also provide many environmental, economic and social benefits. We applaud West Linn's elected officials, volunteers and citizens for providing vital care for its urban forest."

Geography
The city is located between the Willamette and Tualatin rivers; it includes the former townsites/developments of Willamette, Bolton, Multnomah City, Sunset City, and West Oregon City. Willamette was incorporated in 1908, the City of West Linn was incorporated in 1913, and the two towns merged in 1916. Later annexations brought in the Cedaroak, Marylhurst and Hidden Springs neighborhoods. Infill created the Tanner Basin and Tannler neighborhoods. 

The Nature Conservancy maintains the Camassia Natural Area in central West Linn as one of its conservancy preserves. The -area is located on a rocky plateau exposed by the Bretz Floods and now named after the camas which bloom there in spring; it hosts about 300 other species, including the white rock larkspur, a species located in only a half dozen other places in the world.  It supports Oregon white oak-madrone woodlands, a stand of quaking aspen, wet meadows, ponds, and vernal pools.

The Mary S. Young State Recreation Area, located between Oregon Route 43 and the Willamette River, featuring a large off leash dog area, soccer fields and 5–8 miles worth of trails is located in West Linn.

West Linn is located in the area where the Willamette Meteorite was placed by the Missoula Floods.

Climate

Demographics

The median income for a household in the city was $72,010, and the median income for a family was $83,252 (These figures had risen to $94,844 and $108,821 respectively as of a 2007 estimate). Males had a median income of $61,458 versus $38,733 for females. The per capita income for the city was $34,671, among the state's top five. About 2.9% of families and 3.9% of the population were below the poverty line, including 3.6% of those under age 18 and 4.2% of those age 65 or over.

2010 census
As of the census of 2010, there were 25,109 people, 9,523 households, and 7,081 families residing in the city. The racial makeup of the city was 90.7% White, 0.7% African American, 0.3% Native American, 4.0% Asian, 0.1% Pacific Islander, 1.0% from other races, and 3.1% from two or more races. Hispanic or Latino of any race were 4.0% of the population.

There were 9,523 households, of which 37.8% had children under the age of 18 living with them, 61.8% were married couples living together, 9.0% had a female householder with no husband present, 3.6% had a male householder with no wife present, and 25.6% were non-families. 20.6% of all households were made up of individuals, and 6.3% had someone living alone who was 65 years of age or older. The average household size was 2.62 and the average family size was 3.04.

The median age in the city was 41.5 years. 26.3% of residents were under the age of 18; 5.9% were between the ages of 18 and 24; 23.3% were from 25 to 44; 33.4% were from 45 to 64; and 11.1% were 65 years of age or older. The gender makeup of the city was 48.7% male and 51.3% female.

Education
Public schools in West Linn, including West Linn High School, are part of the West Linn-Wilsonville School District.  It is also home to Columbia Academy, a private school licensed by Applied Scholastics.

The city operates the West Linn Public Library as part of the Library Information Network of Clackamas County.

Media
West Linn Tidings

Notable people

 Steve Blake, former professional basketball player
 Gert Boyle, the chairwoman of Columbia Sportswear, resident beginning in 1987
 Jennifer and Sarah Hart, perpetrators of the Hart family murders
 Darlene Hooley, United States Congresswoman
 Nate McMillan, former head coach of the Portland Trail Blazers
 Cade McNown, football player
 Cole Gillespie, baseball player
 Michael Harper, former basketball player for the Portland Trail Blazers
 Robert Moore, founder of Linn City
 Brandon Roy, former basketball player for the Portland Trail Blazers
 Chael Sonnen, mixed martial artist
 Mitch Williams, baseball player
 Monty Williams, former NBA player, former assistant coach of the Portland Trail Blazers, head coach of the Phoenix Suns
Payton Pritchard, basketball player

See also
Tualatin Valley Fire and Rescue

References

External links

City of West Linn (official website)
West Linn listing in the Oregon Blue Book
West Linn Chamber of Commerce

 
Cities in Oregon
Cities in Clackamas County, Oregon
Populated places established in 1913
Portland metropolitan area
1913 establishments in Oregon
Populated places on the Willamette River